Cadwgan ab Owain (died 951) was a joint king of Glywysing in Wales of the High Middle Ages along with his brother Gruffydd. His other brother Morgan ruled in Gwent.

His murder "by the Saxons" was recorded in the Annals of Wales. Phillimore's reconstruction of the dates places the entry in AD 951. Afterwards, the kingdoms of Gwent and Glywysing were united under his brother Morgan as Morgannwg.

References

Year of birth unknown
951 deaths
10th-century Welsh monarchs
Monarchs of Morgannwg